Svenja Pages (born August 3, 1966 in Rheydt, Germany) is a German television actress.

Filmography 
 Diese Drombuschs (1986)
 Ein Fall für zwei (1988)
 Derrick (1989)
 Jede Menge Schmidt (1989)
 Drunter und drüber (1989)
 Anwalt Abel (1990)
 Einer für alle (1991)
 Immer wieder Sonntag (1993)
 Hallo, Onkel Doc! (1994)
 Freunde fürs Leben (1994)
 Die Kommissarin (1994)
 Der Fahnder (1996)
 Und morgen fängt das Leben an (1996)
 Die Cleveren (1998)
 Siska (1998)
 Die Männer vom K3 - Liebestest (1998)
 Tatort - Auf dem Kriegspfad (1999)
 Ein unmöglicher Mann (2000)
 Drei mit Herz (2002)
 Flamenco der Liebe (2002)
 Utta Danella - Die andere Eva (2003)

External links

German television actresses
1966 births
Living people
People from Mönchengladbach
20th-century German actresses
21st-century German actresses